Antaeotricha carabophanes is a moth in the family Depressariidae. It was described by Edward Meyrick in 1932. It is found in Colombia.

References

Moths described in 1932
carabophanes
Taxa named by Edward Meyrick
Moths of South America